Marc Liegghio (born February 13, 1997) is a professional Canadian football placekicker and punter for the Winnipeg Blue Bombers of the Canadian Football League (CFL).

Amateur career 
Liegghio played U Sports football for the Western Mustangs from 2015 to 2019. He sat out the 2015 season due to injury, but became the team's placekicker and punter in 2016 where he was named an OUA Second Team All-Star. 

In 2017, Liegghio was named a U Sports Second-team All-Canadian as a placekicker after connecting on 29 of 33 field goal attempts and all but one of his point-after-touchdown converts. He finished that season as a Vanier Cup champion when the Mustangs completed an undefeated season and defeated the Laval Rouge et Or in the 53rd Vanier Cup game. In that game, Liegghio missed his only field goal attempt, but was perfect on five point-after-touchdown converts and had eight punts with a 41.8-yard average. In 2018, he was named a U Sports Second-team All-Canadian, but this time as a punter. His best season came in 2019 when he became the first player to be named a U Sports First-team All-Canadian at both the placekicker and punter positions as he set a U Sports single-season record with a 47.5-yard punt average and connected on 22 out of 24 field goal attempts. In four seasons with the Mustangs, he became the all-time leading scorer in OUA history with 442 points and set the U Sports record with 92 successfully made field goals (from 105 attempts).

Professional career 
Liegghio was drafted in the fifth round, 39th overall, in the 2020 CFL Draft, by the Winnipeg Blue Bombers. However, he did not play in 2020 due to the cancellation of both the 2020 CFL season and the 2020 U Sports football season. Instead, he signed with the Blue Bombers on January 7, 2021 to a rookie contract. He was named the team's punter following training camp with Tyler Crapigna handling the placekicking duties. Liegghio played in his first professional game on August 5, 2021 against the Hamilton Tiger-Cats where he had 10 punts for a 41.4-yard average (36.2-yards net average). With Crapigna out with injury in the week 4 game against the Calgary Stampeders, Liegghio was also named the team's placekicker for the August 29, 2021 game.

References

External links
Winnipeg Blue Bombers bio

1997 births
Living people
Canadian football placekickers
Canadian football punters
People from Vaughan
Players of Canadian football from Ontario
Western Mustangs football players
Winnipeg Blue Bombers players